"The Rank and File" is an American television play broadcast on May 28, 1959 as part of the CBS television series, Playhouse 90.  The cast includes Van Heflin and Charles Bronson. The teleplay was written by Rod Serling

Plot
An alcoholic factory worker, Bill Kilcoyne, becomes the president of the local union, rises to national prominence, and becomes involved in corruption and racketeering. He is called to testify before the U.S. Senate where he tells his story.

Cast
The cast includes the following:

 Van Heflin - Bill Kilcoyne
 Luther Adler - Irving Werner
 Harry Townes - Gabe Brewster
 Charles Bronson - Andy Kovaric
 Cameron Prudhomme -Joseph Farrell
 Carl Benton Reid -  Senator Henders
 Bruce Gordon - Tony Russo
 Whitney Blake - Martha Brewster
 Addison Richards - Harker
 Wright King - Riley
 Tom Palmer - Eaton
 Danny Richards - Charlie Hacker
 Joe Sullivan - Union Man
 Clegg Hoyt - Guard
 Bruce Hall - Dickson
 Henry Barnard - The Secretary
 Alfred Hopson - Striker
 Jay Overholts - Striker
 Robert Cass - Striker

Production
The program aired on May 28, 1959, on the CBS television series Playhouse 90. Rod Serling was the writer and Franklin Schaffner the director.

References

1959 American television episodes
Playhouse 90 (season 3) episodes
1959 television plays